Albert Kendra (14 December 1883 Laitsna-Rogosi Parish, Võru County – 24 April 1942 Sevurallag, Perm Oblast) was an Estonian politician. He was a member of VI Riigikogu (its Chamber of Deputies).

References

1883 births
1942 deaths
Members of the Riigivolikogu